Przygód kilka wróbla Ćwirka (A Few Adventures of Sparrow Tweet) was a Polish cartoon from 1983-1989 made by Se-ma-for.

External links

Fictional passerine birds
Polish children's animated television series
1989 Polish television series endings